The teams event of the 2017 BWF World Junior Championships was held on 9–14 October. The event also known as the 2017 Suhandinata Cup. The defending champions of the last edition is China. The group draw was done at the Hotel Indonesia Kempinski, Jakarta, on 28 September. China were drawn with Chinese Taipei, Denmark, Algeria, and Hong Kong in group G. Indonesia as the host were drawn with Mongolia and Brazil in group H1.

China won the cup after defeating Malaysia 3–1 in the final.

Group stage

Group A

Group A1

Group A2

Group A play-offs

Group B

Group B1

Group B2

Group B play-offs

Group C

Group C1

Group C2

Group C play-offs

Group D

Group E

Group F

Group F1

Group F2

Group F play-offs

Group G

Group H

Group H1

Group H2

Group H play-offs

Final stage

1st to 8th

1st to 8th quarterfinals

5th to 8th semifinals

1st to 4th semifinals

7th-8th place match

5th-6th place match

Final

9th to 16th

17th to 24th

25th to 32nd

33rd to 40th

41st to 44th

References

External links
 Tournament draw

Teams
World Junior